Herbert Creek is a stream in the U.S. state of South Dakota.

A variant name was Abear Creek. The stream has the name of Raymond Herbert, a pioneer settler.

See also
List of rivers of South Dakota

References

Rivers of Dewey County, South Dakota
Rivers of Ziebach County, South Dakota
Rivers of South Dakota